Bielsko-Biała is a city in southern Poland created after the merging of two closely situated cities, Bielsko and Biała, in 1951. As separate entities, the cities have a lengthy history.

Early history

Between 1933 and 1938 an archaeological team discovered remains of a fortified settlement in what is now Stare Bielsko (Old Bielsko) district of the city. The settlement was dated to the 12th - 14th centuries. Its dwellers manufactured iron from ore and specialized in smithery.

The current center of the town was probably developed as early as the first half of the 13th century. At that time a castle (which still survives today) was built on a hill.

In the second half of the 13th century, the Piast Dukes of Opole (Oppeln) invited German settlers to land between Silesia and Lesser Poland in order to colonize the Silesian Beskids. Nearby settlements west of the Biała River were Nikelsdorf, Kamitz, Alt-Bielitz (now Stare Bielsko), Batzdorf and Kurzwald. Nearby settlements east of the river Bialka were Kunzendorf, Alzen and Wilmesau. Nearby settlements in the mountains were Lobnitz and Bistrai.

After the partition of the Duchy of Oppeln in 1281, Bielsko passed to the Dukes of Cieszyn (Teschen). The town was first documented in 1312 when a Duke of Cieszyn granted a town charter. From 1457 the Biała River was the border between Silesia (within the Holy Roman Empire) and Lesser Poland. The town of Biała was established on the opposite bank of the Biała River in 1723.

During the First Partition of Poland in 1772, Biała was annexed by Austria and included in the crownland of Galicia. In 1918 both cities became part of a reconstituted Polish state, even though the majority of the population was ethnic German. During World War II the city was annexed by Nazi Germany and its Jewish population was sent to Auschwitz concentration camp. After the liberation of the city by the Red Army in 1945, the ethnic German population was expelled westward.

Modern history

Local election results
The results of municipal elections held in Bielsko in December 1936 are as follows:

Formation of Bielsko-Biała
The city of Bielsko-Biała was created on 1 January 1951 when the adjacent cities of Bielsko and Biała were unified.

References 

Bielsko-Biała
Bielsko-Biala
Bielsko